Lotfi Rhim (born 1968) is a Tunisian football manager.

References

1968 births
Living people
Tunisian football managers
US Monastir (football) managers
EGS Gafsa managers
Najran SC managers
ES Hammam-Sousse managers
AS Djerba managers
Olympique Béja managers
EO Sidi Bouzid managers
US Ben Guerdane managers
US Tataouine managers
Étoile Sportive du Sahel managers
Tunisian expatriate football managers
Expatriate football managers in Saudi Arabia
Tunisian expatriate sportspeople in Saudi Arabia
Expatriate football managers in Bahrain
Tunisian expatriate sportspeople in Bahrain
Expatriate football managers in Jordan
Tunisian expatriate sportspeople in Jordan
Expatriate football managers in Morocco
Tunisian expatriate sportspeople in Morocco
Expatriate football managers in Oman
Tunisian expatriate sportspeople in Oman